The 2018 Malaysia Challenge Cup group stage featured 8 teams. The teams were drawn into two groups of four, and played each other home-and-away in a round-robin format. The top two teams in each group advanced to the semi finals.

The group stage will start on 7 August 2018 and concludes on 19 September 2018.

Groups

Group A

Group B

References

External links
 

2018 in Malaysian football